In the field of engineering mechanics, a zero force member is a member (a single truss segment) in a truss which, given a specific load, is at rest: neither in tension, nor in compression.

Description
In a truss, a zero force member is often found at pins (any connections within the truss) where no external load is applied, and three or fewer truss members meet. Identification of basic zero force members can be accomplished by analyzing the forces acting on an individual pin in a physical system.

If the pin has an external force or moment applied to it, then all of the members attached to that pin are not zero force members unless the external force acts in a manner that fulfills one of the rules below:
 If two non-collinear members meet in an unloaded joint, both are zero-force members.
 If three members meet in an unloaded joint of which two are collinear, then the third member is a zero-force member.

Reasons to include zero force members in a truss system
It is a common practice to eliminate zero force members from a truss, to simplify analysis. Although an absolute minimalist design might eliminate all zero force elements from a truss, there are still sound reasons to retain some of these components in actual built systems:
These members can contribute to the stability of the structure, by preventing buckling of long slender members under compressive forces
These members can increase rigidity when variations are introduced in the normal external loading configuration, including dynamic and variable forces.

See also
 Structural engineering
 Neutral plane

External links
 Truss Overview
 Another Truss Overview

Sources
 Engineering Mechanics Volume 1: Equilibrium,  by C. Hartsuijker and J.W. Welleman

Structural analysis
Statics